Whoever Dies, Dies in Pain is a 1998 Canadian docufiction film, directed by Robert Morin. Exploring the issue of addiction and starring a cast of predominantly non-professional actors, the film centres on a group of addicts in a crack house, who are telling their stories to a journalist (Bernard Émond) during a police siege.

The film won the Prix Luc-Perreault from the Association québécoise des critiques de cinéma.

References

External links

1998 films
Canadian docufiction films
Films shot in Quebec
Films directed by Robert Morin
French-language Canadian films
1990s Canadian films